Kent County Council held its elections on 7 June 2001, on the same day as the 2001 United Kingdom general election. They were followed by the 2005 Kent County Council election.

Elections were held in all divisions across Kent, excepting Medway Towns which is a unitary authority.

Summary of 2001 results
Elections were held in 2001 across Kent.

References

2001 English local elections
2001
2000s in Kent
June 2001 events in the United Kingdom